Marie Angel (b. Pinnaroo, South Australia, Australia, 3 June 1953) is an Australian-born opera singer. She sings both operas in the standard repertoire as well as contemporary operas by such composers as Mauricio Kagel, Bruno Maderna, Michael Tippett, Harrison Birtwistle, Philip Glass, Louis Andriessen, Michael Nyman, Bernd Alois Zimmermann, and John Cage.

She appeared in the Peter Greenaway film Prospero's Books, as well as in the recording of Michael Nyman's opera Facing Goya.

References

1953 births
Living people
20th-century Australian women opera singers 
21st-century Australian women opera singers